"Bad Boys" is a 1987 song by the Jamaican reggae band Inner Circle, which gained high popularity in the United States after its re-release in 1993, peaking at number eight on the Billboard Hot 100 and number seven on the Top 40 Mainstream. It is well known as the opening theme to the American TV show Cops and the theme song of the Bad Boys franchise.

History
The song was originally released in October 1987 on the album One Way. In 1992, it was also included on the Bad to the Bone album, and the song was released as a single in 1993, after the unexpected success of their previous international hit single "Sweat (A La La La La Long)". "Bad Boys" reached number 52 in the United Kingdom and number eight in the United States. In the latter territory, it was certified Gold and sold 600,000 copies. The song was also released as B-side on Inner Circle's 1992 single, "Sweat (A La La La La Long)". The song was also released as a single in mid-1991 in Norway and Finland, where it peaked at number one.

Charts

Weekly charts

Year-end charts

In popular culture
"Bad Boys" was selected as the theme song for Cops because a field producer for the show happened to be a fan of Inner Circle. The song, which was very popular during the 1990s, is also used in the Will Smith and Martin Lawrence action/comedy film series Bad Boys, which was named after the song.

A parody of the song was used in a fourth season episode of ABC's Fresh Off the Boat where the chorus goes "Good boys, good boys; whatcha gonna do?".

See also
List of number-one singles of 1991 (Finland)
List of number-one songs in Norway

References

1987 songs
1993 singles
Inner Circle (band) songs
Island Records singles
Number-one singles in Finland
Number-one singles in Norway
Songs about crime
Songs about police officers
Television drama theme songs
Bad Boys (franchise)